The 2022–23 Reading F.C. Women season is the club's 16th season and their eighth in the FA Women's Super League, the highest level of the football pyramid.

Season events
On 7 July, Reading announced that Deanna Cooper and Lily Woodham had both signed new two-year contracts with the club, whilst Tia Primmer also signed her first professional contract with the club, until the summer of 2024.

On 20 July, Reading announced that Emma Mitchell had returned to the club and signed a one-year contract, following the birth of her daughter. The following day, 21 July, Reading announced the signing of Brooke Hendrix from Melbourne Victory on a two-year contract.

On 3 August, Reading announced the return of Becky Jane on a one-year contract after she'd left Charlton Athletic.

On 4 August, Crystal Palace announced that Chloe Peplow had joined their club on loan from Reading for the season.

On 5 August, Reading announced the double signing of Northern Ireland internationals Jacqueline Burns from BK Häcken and Glentoran respectively, and the signing of Charlie Wellings from Celtic.

On 11 August, Reading announced the signing of Diane Caldwell after her contract with Manchester United expired at the end of the previous season.

On 9 September, Readings opening day game against Liverpool, scheduled for 11 September, was postponed after the FA postponed all football fixtures from 9 – 11 September as a mark of respect following the death of Elizabeth II the previous day.

On 28 January, Reading announced the return of Jade Moore on loan from Manchester United for the remainder of the season.

On 31 January, Reading announced that Natasha Dowie had joined Liverpool on loan for the remainder of the season, whilst also announcing the signing of Easther Mayi Kith from Kristianstad on a contract until the summer of 2024.

On 2 February, Chloe Peplow ended her loan deal with Crystal Palace, and then joined Southampton on loan for the remainder of the season.

On 4 February, Reading announced the signing of Tinaya Alexander from Montpellier.

Squad

Out on loan

Transfers

In

Loans in

Loans out

Friendlies

Competitions

Overview

WSL

Results summary

Results by matchday

Results

Table

FA Cup

League Cup

Group stage

Squad statistics

Appearances 

|-
|colspan="14"|Players away from the club on loan:

|-
|colspan="14"|Players who appeared for Reading but left during the season:
|}

Goal scorers

Clean sheets

Disciplinary record

References 

Reading
Reading F.C. Women